The Hokkaido Bank Curling Classic is an annual bonspiel on the men's and women's World Curling Tour. It is held annually in early August at the Hokkaido Bank Curling Stadium in Sapporo, Japan. The total purse for the event is ¥ 1,700,000 with the winning team receiving ¥ 1,000,000.

Typically this event allows in-person spectators, but due to COVID-19 restrictions, they weren't permitted in 2021 and 2022. In its place they will be providing streaming from their .

The event hosted an international field from 2016 to 2019. Following its cancellation in 2020, only Japanese teams attended the 2021 event. In 2022, teams from Japan and South Korea competed.

Past champions

Men

Women

References

External links
  
 

World Curling Tour events
Curling competitions in Japan
Women's curling competitions in Japan
Women's World Curling Tour events
Sports competitions in Sapporo